is a 1985 Japanese pink film in Nikkatsu's Roman porno series, directed by Shinji Sōmai and starring Noriko Hayami.

Synopsis
When businessman Tetsuro Muraki has his company go bankrupt and his wife Ryoko is raped by gangsters who use her body to pay off his debts, he succumbs to despair. He hires a prostitute, Nami, to go with him to a love hotel with sex and suicide in mind.

Cast
 Minori Terada as Tetsuro Muraki
 Noriko Hayami as Nami Tsuchiya
 Rie Nakagawa as Masayo Ohta
 Kiriko Shimizu as Ryoko Muraki
 Nobutaka Masutomi as Kiyoshi Ohta
 Toshinori Omi as the Assistant Director
 Kōichi Satō as the Taxi Driver

Background
Although director Shinji Sōmai had worked for Nikkatsu in the 1970s and served as an assistant director, this film marked his only work in the Roman porno genre for Nikkatsu. The film was produced by the Directors's Company, an association of young directors formed in 1982. The screenplay was the work of Takashi Ishii who would later rework the script for his directorial debut, the 1988 film Angel Guts: Red Vertigo.

Awards and nominations
7th Yokohama Film Festival 
Won: Best Film
Won: Best Director - Shinji Sōmai
Won: Best Screenplay - Takashi Ishii
Won: Best Cinematography - Noboru Shinoda
Won: Best Actor - Minori Terada

The film also won the Nikkatsu in-house award for Best Film of the Year.

References

External links

Films directed by Shinji Sōmai
Pink films
Nikkatsu films
1980s erotic films
1980s pornographic films
1980s Japanese films